South Kilkerran is a locality  in the Australian state of South Australia located on Yorke Peninsula between Maitland and Port Victoria.

South Kilkerran is still the home of St John's Lutheran church. It formerly also had a St Paul's Lutheran church, and both churches had schools associated with them, which are now closed.

The 2016 Australian census which was conducted in August 2016 reports that South Kilkerran had a population of 54 people.

South Kilkerran is located within the federal division of Grey, the state electoral district of Narungga and the local government area of the Yorke Peninsula Council.

References

Towns in South Australia
Yorke Peninsula